Otterbein Church may refer to:

Otterbein Church (Baltimore, Maryland), listed on the NRHP in Maryland 
Otterbein Church (Evans, West Virginia), listed on the NRHP in West Virginia